Haroonabad or Harunabad (Punjabi,) is a tehsil (sub-district) in Bahawalnagar District of the Punjab Province of Pakistan. The town is the headquarters of Haroonabad Tehsil and administrative subdivision of the district. It is the 92nd largest city of Pakistan, according to 2017 census.

History 
Haroonabad Town is a tehsil headquarter and an important Mandi town of Bahawalnagar District. The history of the town is not very old. It was laid out and established as a Mandi Town under the Satluj valley project during the colonization of the region in English rule in second decade of the 20th century. Before colonization, the site of the present Haroonabad Town was known as Toba Badru Wala. The word "Toba" in the local language means "pond". It is said that there was a big natural pond to the north side of the railway station at a small distance where rain water was collected. The availability of water in this deserted area had attracted the natives. The main occupation of the natives was cattle farming and cultivation on a small scale during the rainy season. The caste of local people who lived there was "Joiya Badru". This small settlement was named as "Toba Badru Wala" because of their caste.

Railway
In 1927, the branch railway line linking Fortabbas town with Bahawalnagar city was constructed. The railway station at Haroonabad town was built in the same year and was called Badru Wala Station. A grain market, a few shops and dwelling units were developed along Chaman Bazar, Railway Bazaar and Main Bazaar in the beginning. The establishment of irrigation system/canal system under the Satluj valley project in 1934 added to the agricultural production of the hinterland and provided a significant economic base to this small settlement. The construction of 3R and 4R Canals in the region brought most of the area under the irrigation system. The town began to flourish as a Mandi town rapidly due to increasing economic and commercial activities.

The town was renamed as Haroonabad town after the name of Prince Haroon-ur-Rashid (1924-1972), the son of Nawab of Bahawalpur sir Sadeq Mohammad Khan V.

Post 1947
At the time of the partition of the subcontinent in 1947, a large number of refugees settled here and the population of the town was substantially increased. Development of some residential colonies, establishment of social services like educational and health institutions and provision of public utilities made living conditions in the town more attractive and resulted in rapid growth.

Administration 
Haroonabad consists of 26 Unions which are mostly villages. The only noticeable sub-urban town is Faqirwali apart from Haroonabad city's own unions.

Economy and politicians 
The economy is based around agriculture, cotton being of major importance, followed by cauliflower. The headquarters of three national brands of tea are also here, Vital Tea , Chitan tea and Prime Tea.

Wastewater is not used for irrigation.

References

Populated places in Bahawalnagar District
Cities in Pakistan
Cities and towns in Punjab, Pakistan
Cities and towns in Bahawalnagar District